Joseph Umstatt (5 February 1711 in Vienna - 24 May 1762 in Bamberg) was an Austrian composer of the early Classical era.

Life
Joseph Umstatt grew up in Vienna, and may have been a pupil of Johann Joseph Fux. From 1727 to 1730 he studied at the Jesuit College in Tyrnau, one of the distinguished centres of music education in the then-Kingdom of Hungary (today Trnava in Slovakia). He was a harpsichordist and organist at the chapel of Imre Esterhazy (Archbishop of Esztergom) in Pressburg (Bratislava), and later under the Count of Dietrichstein near Brünn (Brno). The Saxon Prime Minister Heinrich von Brühl engaged Umstatt as Hofkapellmeister shortly before his death in 1762.

Works
Umstatt was considered one of the most original composers of Viennese harpsichord music in the first half of the 18th century. He also composed sacred music such as oratorios, masses (e.g. the "Missa Natalitia") and requiems, as well as secular musical dramas. However, the vast majority of his work consists of symphonies, concertos and chamber music.

References

1711 births
1762 deaths
Austrian Baroque composers
Austrian Classical-period composers